Ľuboš Šoška (born 21 December 1977 in Žilina) is a Slovak slalom canoeist who competed at the international level from 1994 to 2006.

He won a bronze medal in the C2 team event at the 2006 ICF Canoe Slalom World Championships in Prague. He also won a bronze medal at the 1996 European Championships in Augsburg.

Šoška finished 10th in the C2 event at the 1996 Summer Olympics in Atlanta.

His partner in the C2 boat throughout the whole of his active career was his older brother Peter Šoška.

World Cup individual podiums

References

1977 births
Canoeists at the 1996 Summer Olympics
Living people
Olympic canoeists of Slovakia
Slovak male canoeists
Sportspeople from Žilina
Medalists at the ICF Canoe Slalom World Championships